The United Arab Emirates competed at the 2000 Summer Paralympics in Sydney, Australia. 14 competitors from the United Arab Emirates won 4 medals, including 3 silver and 1 bronze to finish joint 52nd in the medal table along with the Faroe Islands.

Medallists

See also 
 United Arab Emirates at the Paralympics
 United Arab Emirates at the 2000 Summer Olympics

References 

United Arab Emirates at the Paralympics
Nations at the 2000 Summer Paralympics